Tasmina Ahmed-Sheikh OBE WS NP (born 5 October 1970) is a Scottish politician who was the  Member of Parliament (MP) for Ochil and South Perthshire from 2015 to 2017. A former member of the Scottish Conservative party, Labour and the Scottish National Party (SNP), Ahmed-Sheikh served as the SNP's Trade and Investment spokesperson, Deputy Shadow Leader of the House in the House of Commons, and the SNP's National Women's and Equalities Convener.  A solicitor and businessperson, and a former actress, Ahmed-Sheikh founded and formerly chaired the Scottish Asian Women's Association.

After losing her parliamentary seat, Ahmed-Sheikh started working at RT UK on The Alex Salmond Show. In March 2021 she defected from the SNP to the Alba Party and then stood as Alba's top list candidate in Central Scotland at the 2021 Scottish Parliament election, but neither she nor her party succeeded in gaining a seat.

Early life and education 
Tasmina Ahmed-Sheikh was born in Chelsea, London in 1970, and raised in Edinburgh. Her mother is a half-Welsh, half-Czech actress who performed with the Royal Shakespeare Company and completed a law degree in her retirement. Her father, Mohammad bin Ashiq Rizvi, MA, LL.B, JP, was born in British India and brought up in Pakistan after Partition. He moved to Britain in 1962, working first as a lecturer in English at the University of London and then as an insurance broker. He was a Conservative politician, serving as councillor on the New Town/Stockbridge division on Lothian Regional Council from 1986 to 1994 and standing for Edinburgh Leith in 1992. He was the first Asian Conservative councillor in Scotland. 

Ahmed-Sheikh was educated at Craigmount High School, George Heriot's School in Edinburgh, the University of Edinburgh (MA) and the University of Strathclyde (LLB & Postgraduate Diploma in Law). She has a sister who is a London-based barrister.

Acting career
After graduating in law, Ahmed-Sheikh made acting her first career. She starred in the Pakistani drama series Des Pardes. These led to a series of local modelling shoots. She starred in the 2000 drama Aansoo, playing Imaan, the daughter of a mixed-race Scottish-Pakistani couple; the drama was filmed in both countries and was produced by her husband Zulfikar Sheikh. She produced and appeared in The Castle: Aik Umeed (2001).

Legal career
Ahmed-Sheikh became a partner at the Glasgow law firm Hamilton Burns, specialising in commercial conveyancing and private client work, often with a family law or immigration element.

On 15 January 2019, she was found guilty of professional misconduct by the Scottish Solicitors' Discipline Tribunal (SSDT) and fined £3,000. The Tribunal found that Ahmed-Sheikh and fellow solicitor Alan Mickel had shown "disregard for the rules" in running a trust and had a conflict of interest when they borrowed money from it to help their ailing firm. In addition to their fines, the pair also had to pay the expenses of the Law Society of Scotland, which had brought the case forward.

In September 2021, the SSDT found her guilty for a second time when she was ruled to have committed "recklessness by omission" during her tenure as the designated cashroom partner at Hamilton Burns, which went into administration in 2017. Ahmed-Sheikh admitted six other breaches of financial rules too but was cleared of any suggestion of dishonesty or a lack of integrity.

Political career 
Ahmed-Sheikh was active in the Scottish Conservatives from the age of 10 and a member from 16. She was chairperson of Edinburgh Central Young Conservatives and deputy spokeswoman for the party on women and family issues and equal opportunities. She stood as the party's candidate in Glasgow Govan in the 1999 Scottish Parliament election, where she came in third place with 2,343 votes (8.88%).

While a Conservative party member she criticised Alex Salmond as "hopelessly out of his depth" and "utterly naive" for his comments condemning NATO's intervention in Kosovo.
 
In 2000, she resigned from the Conservatives in response to William Hague's "right wing" pronouncements on asylum seekers. She briefly joined the Labour Party before declaring that she would join the Scottish National Party, and was welcomed as a 'defector'. "I am not an opportunist, I have changed political parties - so what?", Ahmed-Sheikh said at the time. Salmond said he was "glad she had joined the party". 

In July 2012, she joined the Advisory Board of Yes Scotland, the cross-party campaign for Scottish independence ahead of the upcoming referendum.

In May 2014 she was the third candidate on the SNP's list for the European Parliament election, but did not win a seat.

In the 2015 general election, Ahmed-Sheikh was elected to the UK Parliament in the Ochil and South Perthshire constituency, earning 46% of the vote as the SNP took the seat from Labour incumbent Gordon Banks. She was Scotland's first female Muslim MP. However she lost the seat at the following 2017 general election to Luke Graham of the Conservative Party. During that election campaign, financial allegations emerged, regarding her time as a solicitor; calls were made for her to be suspended from the SNP, but leader Nicola Sturgeon stood by her. 

In 2019, it was reported the SNP declined her application to stand in the upcoming European Parliament election of that year.

On 31 March 2021, she was unveiled as a candidate for the Alba Party in the 2021 Scottish Parliament election, and stood for the party in Central Scotland. She was unsuccessful, as were all the other Alba candidates in the election.

Ahmed-Sheikh's political position is described as centre-right. She supports Scottish republicanism.

Charity work 
Ahmed-Sheikh founded and chaired the Scottish Asian Women's Association. It launched on 19 April 2012 at Stirling Castle, with the Scottish government supporting this event, to the equivalent of around £16,000. Ahmed-Sheikh resigned as a trustee of SAWA after her election as an MP in 2015. In January 2016, The Herald reported that during the period Ahmed-Sheikh was chair, only a small proportion (3%) of the SAWA's income had been donated to charitable causes. The charity was wound up in 2018.

She was involved with British Muslim Awards from its inception, presenting the awards at the inaugural ceremony in 2013 and in 2014.

She is a trustee of Scottish Women in Sport, a charity founded in 2013.

Awards and honours
She was appointed Officer of the Order of the British Empire (OBE) in the 2014 New Year Honours for services to business and to the Asian community in Scotland.

Media work 
Ahmed-Sheikh is co-owner, along with Alex Salmond, of Slainte Media, a production company behind The Alex Salmond Show, and regularly co-hosted the programme on RT. until the channel was closed down in March 2022 following the Russian invasion of Ukraine.

Ahmed-Sheikh wrote a column in The National for eight years, signing off in March 2023.

Personal life 
A Muslim, Ahmed-Sheikh married Zulfiqar Sheikh in 1991 and they have four children—Elysée, Saif, Shansee and Vaneesee.

References

External links 

 
 Biography - Tasmina Ahmed Sheikh Scottish National Party (Archived)
 Tasmina Ahmed Sheikh's Westminister Maiden Speech YouTube, 6 June 2015
 

1970 births
Living people
21st-century Scottish women politicians
21st-century Scottish politicians
Alumni of the University of Edinburgh
Alumni of the University of Strathclyde
British politicians of Pakistani descent
English people of Czech descent
English people of Pakistani descent
English people of Welsh descent
Female members of the Parliament of the United Kingdom for Scottish constituencies
Officers of the Order of the British Empire
People educated at Craigmount High School
People educated at George Heriot's School
Scottish Conservative Party politicians
Scottish Muslims
Scottish National Party MPs
Scottish people of Czech descent
Scottish people of Pakistani descent
Scottish people of Welsh descent
Scottish solicitors
UK MPs 2015–2017
Scottish television presenters
Scottish women television presenters
RT (TV network) people
Alba Party politicians